Juan Manuel Gaminara (born 1 May 1989) is a Uruguayan rugby union player. He was named in Uruguay's squad for the 2015 Rugby World Cup.

Personal
Gaminara was educated at The British Schools of Montevideo.

Honours
Uruguay U20
World Rugby Under 20 Trophy: 2008

References

External links

1989 births
Living people
Uruguayan rugby union players
Uruguay international rugby union players
Place of birth missing (living people)
Rugby union flankers
People educated at The British Schools of Montevideo